The Jumping International de France 2010 was the 2010 edition of Jumping International de France, the French official show jumping horse show, in the Stadium François André in La Baule-Escoublac. It was held as CSIO 5*.

The first horse show were held 1931 in La Baule, since 1960 La Baule is the location of the French official show jumping horse show (CSIO = Concours de Saut International Officiel). This year the 50 year-jubilee as CSIO is celebrated.

The 2010 edition of Jumping International de France was held between May 13, 2010 and May 16, 2010.

FEI Nations Cup of France 
The 2010 FEI Nations Cup of France was part of the Jumping International de France 2010. It was the first competition of the 2010 Meydan FEI Nations Cup. 

The 2010 FEI Nations Cup of France was held at Friday, May 14, 2010 at 3:25 pm. The competing teams were: France, the United States of America, Germany, Switzerland, the Netherlands, Ireland, Sweden, the United Kingdom, Spain and Poland. It was first time a team of a former Eastern Bloc nation, Poland, competing in a competition of the Meydan FEI Nations Cup (former Samsung Super League).

The competition was a show jumping competition with two rounds and optionally one jump-off. The height of the fences was up to 1.60 meters. Eight of ten teams were allowed to start in the second round.

The competition is endowed with 200,000 €.

(grey penalties points do not count for the team result)

Grand Prix Longines de la ville de la Baule 
The Grand Prix de la ville de la Baule was the mayor competition of the Jumping International de France 2010. It was held at Sunday, May 16, 2010 at 1:40 pm. The competition was a show jumping competition with one round and one jump-off, the height of the fences was up to 1.60 meters. 

The main sponsor of the Grand Prix de la ville de la Baule is Longines. The Grand Prix was endowed with 200,000 €.

(Top 5 of 50 Competitors)

References

External links 
 official website
 2010 results

2010 in show jumping
Jumping International de France